The North Fork Brewery,  is a pizzeria, brewery, and wedding chapel, is located on the way to Mount Baker on State Route 542 in Deming, Washington.  In addition to brewing IPAs, barleywines, and other ales in their relatively small 3.5 barrel brewing system, the North Fork serves pizza, houses a diverse collection of beer-related objects, and performs marriage ceremonies.  The North Fork Brewery opened in 1997.

References

External links 
The North Fork Brewery

Beer brewing companies based in Washington (state)